Nikolay Teterkin (28 July 1924 – 9 February 2003) was a Soviet sprint canoeist who competed in the early 1950s. He finished tenth in the K-2 10000 m event at the 1952 Summer Olympics in Helsinki.

References
Nikolay Teterkin's profile at Sports Reference.com
Biography of Nikolay Teterkin 

1924 births
2003 deaths
Canoeists at the 1952 Summer Olympics
Olympic canoeists of the Soviet Union
Soviet male canoeists